Just Lookin' for a Hit is the first greatest hits compilation album released by American country music artist Dwight Yoakam. It includes eight singles from his 1980s albums for Reprise Records, as well as two newly recorded cover songs: "Long White Cadillac", originally recorded by The Blasters, and "Sin City", originally recorded by the Flying Burrito Brothers.

Recording
The collection is best known for containing the Dave Alvin composition “Long White Cadillac,” a song about the death of Hank Williams, who died in the backseat of a Cadillac on his way to a show in Canton, Ohio on New Year’s Day, 1953.   Yoakam played gigs alongside Alvin's band The Blasters, Los Lobos, X, and others in the rock and punk clubs of Los Angeles, and, beginning in 1986, Yoakam scored a run of three consecutive number one country albums.  According to Don McLeese’s book A Thousand Miles from Nowhere, Alvin was overjoyed when Yoakam, one of the hottest stars in country music at the time, told him he was going to record the song:

Yoakam later insisted, “I did it because I loved that song.  I thought it was one of the greatest songs ever written.  A rock and roll homage to Hank Williams, who was essentially the first rock star.”  The album also contains a cover version of the Flying Burrito Brothers song “Sin City,” which was written by Chris Hillman and Gram Parsons.  Parsons, who also died young, was a country-rock pioneer and guiding light behind the Byrds’ seminal Sweetheart of the Rodeo album that Yoakam highly regarded.  He sang the tune as a duet with Canadian singer k.d. lang, who, like Yoakam, was a maverick on the country music scene at the time.

Reception
AllMusic: “When one considers that these are merely highlights - and some of them arguable choices -from his first three records, the true value of Yoakam as a recording artist who single-handedly revitalized traditional country music becomes evident. This is a smoking hits collection but is only a taste of the treasures that lie within the individual albums themselves.”

Track listing

Personnel
 Pete Anderson – acoustic guitar, six-string bass guitar, electric guitar, percussion
 Tom Brumley – pedal steel guitar
 Jeff Donavan – drums
 Skip Edwards – piano
 J.D. Foster – bass guitar
 Glen D. Hardin – piano
 Flaco Jiménez – accordion
 Scott Joss – mandolin, background vocals
 Brantley Kearns – fiddle, background vocals
 k.d. lang – duet vocals on "Sin City"
 Jim Lauderdale – background vocals 
 Buck Owens – duet vocals on "Streets of Bakersfield"
 Taras Prodaniuk – bass guitar
 Don Reed – fiddle
 Dusty Wakeman – six-string bass guitar
 Dwight Yoakam – acoustic guitar, percussion, lead vocals, background vocals

Chart positions

Weekly charts

Year-end charts

Singles

Certifications

References

Bibliography

1989 greatest hits albums
Dwight Yoakam albums
Reprise Records compilation albums
Albums produced by Pete Anderson